Centro Social de São João  is a futsal team based in the village of Pé de Cão in the freguesia of São Martinho do Bispo e Ribeira de Frades, Portugal that plays in the Portuguese Futsal First Division.

Current squad

References

External links
 Zerozero

Futsal clubs in Portugal